The Razzie Award for Worst Remake, Rip-off or Sequel is an award presented at the annual Golden Raspberry Awards for the worst film adapted from some form of previous material (derivative work). The category covers films that are prequels, sequels, remakes, reboots, spin-offs, film adaptations of other media franchises, mockbusters and "rip-offs" (thus making the award open to nearly any high concept film with a superficial resemblance to any other work of fiction).

The following is a list of nominees and recipients of that award, including each film's distribution company.

History
From 1994 to 2005, the category was titled Worst Remake or Sequel. The category was divided into Worst Prequel or Sequel and Worst Remake or Rip-off in 2006 and 2007. The categories were again merged in 2008 to form Worst Prequel, Remake, Rip-off or Sequel, and it was shortened to the current title from 2012 onward. The award was not presented in 1996 and 1999.

Criteria
Despite not being mentioned in the name of the award, film adaptations of other media (books, graphic novels, cartoons, etc.) are eligible for nomination (extending the term "remake" broadly to include adaptations).

Razzie nominations have also stretched the definition on occasion; for example, Jack & Jill was described as a "Remake/Ripoff of Glen or Glenda" despite bearing no resemblance beyond that they both feature male actors portraying both male and female characters; this was widely viewed as an excuse to nominate the film in every category. Similarly, Karen was described as an "Inadvertent Remake of Cruella" despite the lack of any real similarity between the two films, and The Meg was listed as a rip-off of Jaws despite both films having little in common beyond having a giant shark as villain.

Worst Remake or Sequel (1994, 1995, 1997, 1998, 2000–2005)
1994 Wyatt Earp (remake/ripoff of Tombstone) – Warner Bros. – Kevin Costner / Lawrence Kasdan / Jim Wilson
Beverly Hills Cop III – Paramount – Robert Rehme / Mace Neufeld
City Slickers II: The Legend of Curly's Gold – Columbia / Castle Rock Entertainment – Billy Crystal
The Flintstones – Universal – Bruce Cohen
Love Affair – Warner Bros. – Warren Beatty
1995 The Scarlet Letter – Hollywood – Roland Joffe / Andrew G. Vajna
Ace Ventura: When Nature Calls – Warner Bros. – James G. Robinson
Dr. Jekyll and Ms. Hyde – Savoy Pictures – Robert Shapiro / Jerry Leider
Showgirls (remake of both All About Eve and The Lonely Lady) – MGM / UA – Charles Evans / Alan Marshall
Village of the Damned – Universal – Michael Preger / Sandy King
1997 Speed 2: Cruise Control – 20th Century Fox – Jan de Bont / Steve Perry / Michael Peyser
Batman & Robin – Warner Bros. – Peter MacGregor-Scott
Home Alone 3 – 20th Century Fox – John Hughes / Hilton Green
The Lost World: Jurassic Park – Universal – Kathleen Kennedy / Gerald R. Molen / Colin Wilson
McHale's Navy – Universal – Bill Sheinberg / Jonathan Sheinberg / Sid Sheinberg
1998 The Avengers – Warner Bros. – Jerry Weintraub (tie)
1998 Godzilla – TriStar – Dean Devlin / Roland Emmerich (tie)
1998 Psycho – Universal – Brian Grazer / Gus Van Sant (tie)
Lost in Space – New Line Cinema – Mark W. Koch / Stephen Hopkins / Akiva Goldsman / Carla Fry
Meet Joe Black (remake of Death Takes a Holiday) – Universal – Martin Brest
2000 Book of Shadows: Blair Witch 2 – Artisan – Bill Carraro
How the Grinch Stole Christmas – Universal – Brian Grazer
The Flintstones in Viva Rock Vegas – Universal – Bruce Cohen
Get Carter – Warner Bros. – Neil Canton / Mark Canton / Elie Samaha
Mission: Impossible 2 – Paramount – Tom Cruise / Paula Wagner
2001 Planet of the Apes – 20th Century Fox – Richard D. Zanuck / Ralph Winter 
Crocodile Dundee in Los Angeles – Paramount – Paul Hogan / Lance Hool
Jurassic Park III – Universal – Kathleen Kennedy / Larry Franco
Pearl Harbor (remake of Tora! Tora! Tora!) – Touchstone – Michael Bay / Jerry Bruckheimer
Sweet November – Warner Bros. – Elliott Kastner / Steven Reuther / Deborah Aal / Erwin Stoff
2002 Swept Away – Screen Gems – Matthew Vaughn
I Spy – Columbia – Mario Kassar / Andrew G. Vajna / Betty Thomas / Jenno Topping
Mr. Deeds (remake of Mr. Deeds Goes to Town) – Columbia / New Line Cinema – Sid Ganis / Jack Giarraputo
Pinocchio – Miramax – Gianluigi Braschi / Nicoletta Braschi / Elda Ferri
Star Wars: Episode II – Attack of the Clones – 20th Century Fox – George Lucas / Rick McCallum
2003 Charlie's Angels: Full Throttle – Columbia – Drew Barrymore / Leonard Goldberg / Nancy Juvonen
2 Fast 2 Furious – Universal – Lee Mayes / Neal H. Moritz
Dumb and Dumberer: When Harry Met Lloyd – New Line Cinema – Troy Miller / Brad Krevoy / Mark Burg / Oren Koules / Toby Emmerich
From Justin to Kelly (remake of both Where the Boys Are and Where the Boys Are '84) – 20th Century Fox – John Steven Agoglia
The Texas Chainsaw Massacre – New Line Cinema – Michael Bay / Mike Fleiss / Brad Fuller / Tobe Hooper / Kim Henkel
2004 Scooby-Doo 2: Monsters Unleashed – Warner Bros. – Charles Roven / Richard Suckle
Alien vs. Predator – 20th Century Fox – Walter Hill / Gordon Carroll / David Giler / John Davis
Anacondas: The Hunt for the Blood Orchid – Screen Gems – Verna Harrah
Around the World in 80 Days – Disney – Bill Badalato / Hal Lieberman
Exorcist: The Beginning – Warner Bros. – Aaron Dem / Guy McElwaine / David C. Robinson / James G. Robinson
2005 Son of the Mask – New Line Cinema – Erica Huggins / Scott Kroopf
Bewitched – Columbia – Nora Ephron / Lucy Fisher / Penny Marshall / Douglas Wick
Deuce Bigalow: European Gigolo – Columbia – Adam Sandler / John Schneider
The Dukes of Hazzard – Warner Bros. – Bill Gerber
House of Wax – Warner Bros. – Susan Levin / Joel Silver / Robert Zemeckis

Worst Prequel or Sequel (2006, 2007)
2006 Basic Instinct 2 – Columbia – Mario Kassar / Joel B. Michaels / Andrew G. Vajna
Big Momma's House 2 – 20th Century Fox – Michael Green / David T. Friendly
Garfield: A Tail of Two Kitties – 20th Century Fox – John Davis
The Santa Clause 3: The Escape Clause – Disney – Tim Allen / Brian Reilly / Jeffrey Silver
The Texas Chainsaw Massacre: The Beginning – New Line Cinema – Michael Bay / Mike Fleiss / Tobe Hooper / Kim Henkel / Andrew Form / Brad Fuller
2007 Daddy Day Camp – TriStar / Revolution Studios – William Sherak / Jason Shuman
Aliens vs. Predator: Requiem – 20th Century Fox – John Davis / David Giler / Walter Hill
Evan Almighty – Universal – Gary Barber / Roger Birnbaum / Michael Bostick / Neal H. Moritz / Tom Shadyac
Hannibal Rising – The Weinstein Company – Dino De Laurentiis / Martha De Laurentiis / Tarak Ben Ammar
Hostel: Part II – Lions Gate – Mike Fleiss / Eli Roth / Chris Briggs

Worst Remake or Rip-off (2006, 2007)
2006 Little Man (rip-off of the 1954 Bugs Bunny cartoon Baby Buggy Bunny) – Columbia / Revolution Studios – Rick Alvares / Lee Mays / Marlon Wayans / Shawn Wayans
The Pink Panther – Columbia – Robert Simonds
Poseidon – Warner Bros. – Wolfgang Petersen / Duncan Henderson / Mike Fleiss / Akiva Goldsman
The Shaggy Dog – Disney – David Hoberman / Tim Allen
The Wicker Man – Warner Bros. – Nicolas Cage / Randall Emmett / Norm Golightly / Avi Lerner / Joanne Sellar
2007 I Know Who Killed Me (rip-off of Hostel, Saw and The Patty Duke Show) – TriStar – David Grace / Frank Mancuso Jr.
Are We Done Yet? (sequel to Are We There Yet?, remake of Mr. Blandings Builds His Dream House) – Columbia / Revolution Studios – Ted Hartley / Ice Cube / Matt Alvarez / Todd Garner
Bratz – Lions Gate – Isaac Larian / Avi Arad / Steven Paul
Epic Movie (rip-off of many films) – 20th Century Fox – Paul Schiff
Who's Your Caddy? (rip-off of Caddyshack) – MGM / Dimension – Christopher Eberts / Tracy Edmonds / Kia Jam / Arnold Rifkin

Worst Prequel, Remake, Rip-off or Sequel (2008–2011)
2008 – Indiana Jones and the Kingdom of the Crystal Skull – Paramount / Lucasfilm – Kathleen Kennedy / Frank Marshall
The Day the Earth Stood Still – 20th Century Fox – Erwin Stoff / Paul Harris Boardman / Gregory Goodman
Disaster Movie – Lions Gate & Meet the Spartans – 20th Century Fox (jointly) – Jason Friedberg / Peter Safran / Aaron Seltzer
Speed Racer – Warner Bros. – Joel Silver / Grant Hill / Lana Wachowski / Andy Wachowski
Star Wars: The Clone Wars – Lucasfilm / Warner Bros. – Catherine Winder
2009 – Land of the Lost – Universal – Sid and Marty Krofft / Jimmy Miller
G.I. Joe: The Rise of Cobra – Paramount / Hasbro – Lorenzo di Bonaventura / Bob Ducsay / Brian Goldner
The Pink Panther 2 – Columbia / Metro-Goldwyn-Mayer – Robert Simonds
Transformers: Revenge of the Fallen – DreamWorks / Paramount / Hasbro – Lorenzo di Bonaventura / Ian Bryce / Tom DeSanto / Don Murphy
The Twilight Saga: New Moon – Summit Entertainment – Wyck Godfrey / Karen Rosenfelt
2010 – Sex and the City 2 – New Line Cinema / Village Roadshow – Michael Patrick King / John Melfi / Sarah Jessica Parker / Darren Star
Clash of the Titans – Warner Bros. – Kevin De La Noy / Basil Iwanyk / Richard D. Zanuck
The Last Airbender – Paramount / Nickelodeon / Kennedy/Marshall – Frank Marshall / Sam Mercer / M. Night Shyamalan
The Twilight Saga: Eclipse – Summit Entertainment – Wyck Godfrey / Karen Rosenfelt
Vampires Suck – 20th Century Fox / Regency – Jason Friedberg / Peter Safran / Aaron Seltzer
2011 – Jack and Jill (remake/rip-off of Glen or Glenda) – Columbia – Adam Sandler / Jack Giarraputo / Todd Garner 
Arthur – Warner Bros. – Larry Brezner / Kevin McCormick / Chris Bender / Michael Tadross
Bucky Larson: Born to Be a Star (rip-off of Boogie Nights and A Star Is Born) – Columbia – Adam Sandler / Jack Giarraputo / Allen Covert / Nick Swardson / David Dorfman
The Hangover Part II – Warner Bros. – Daniel Goldberg / Todd Phillips
The Twilight Saga: Breaking Dawn – Part 1 – Summit Entertainment – Wyck Godfrey / Stephenie Meyer / Karen Rosenfelt

Worst Remake, Rip-off or Sequel (2012–present)
 2012 – The Twilight Saga: Breaking Dawn – Part 2 – Summit Entertainment – Wyck Godfrey / Stephenie Meyer / Karen Rosenfelt
Ghost Rider: Spirit of Vengeance – Columbia – Steven Paul / Ashok Amritaj / Michael De Luca / Avi Arad
Madea's Witness Protection – Lionsgate – Tyler Perry / Ozzie Areu / Paul Hall
Piranha 3DD – Dimension – Mark Canton / Marc Toberoff / Joel Soisson
Red Dawn – FilmDistrict – Beau Flynn / Tripp Vinson
2013 – The Lone Ranger – Disney – Jerry Bruckheimer / Gore Verbinski
Grown Ups 2 – Columbia – Adam Sandler / Jack Giarraputo
The Hangover Part III – Warner Bros. – Daniel Goldberg / Todd Phillips
Scary Movie 5 – The Weinstein Company – David Zucker / Phil Dornfeld
The Smurfs 2 – Columbia – Jordan Kerner
2014 – Annie – Columbia – Jay Brown, Will Gluck, Jada Pinkett Smith, Caleeb Pinkett, Tyran Smith, Will Smith, Shawn 'Jay Z' Carter 
 Atlas Shrugged: Part III – Atlas Distribution Company – John Aglialoro, Harmon Kaslow
 The Legend of Hercules – Summit Entertainment—Boaz Davidson, Renny Harlin, Danny Lerner, Les Weldon
 Teenage Mutant Ninja Turtles – Paramount, Nickelodeon – Michael Bay, Ian Bryce, Andrew Form, Bradley Fuller, Scott Mednick, Galen Walker
 Transformers: Age of Extinction – Paramount, Hasbro – Ian Bryce, Tom DeSanto, Lorenzo di Bonaventura, Don Murphy
2015 – Fantastic Four – 20th Century Fox – Simon Kinberg, Matthew Vaughn, Hutch Parker, Robert Kulzer, Gregory Goodman
 Alvin and the Chipmunks: The Road Chip – 20th Century Fox – Janice Karman, Ross Bagdasarian
 Hot Tub Time Machine 2 – Paramount — Andrew Panay
 The Human Centipede 3 (Final Sequence) – IFC Midnight—Tom Six, Ilona Six
 Paul Blart: Mall Cop 2 – Columbia — Todd Garner, Kevin James, Adam Sandler
2016 – Batman v Superman: Dawn of Justice – Warner Bros. – Charles Roven, Deborah Snyder
Alice Through the Looking Glass – Disney – Joe Roth, Suzanne Todd, Jennifer Todd, Tim Burton
Fifty Shades of Black – Open Road Films – Marlon Wayans, Rick Alvares
Independence Day: Resurgence – 20th Century Fox – Dean Devlin, Harald Kloser, Roland Emmerich
Teenage Mutant Ninja Turtles: Out of the Shadows – Paramount, Nickelodeon – Michael Bay, Andrew Form, Bradley Fuller, Scott Mednick, Galen Walker
Zoolander 2 – Paramount – Stuart Cornfield, Scott Rudin, Ben Stiller, Clayton Townsend
2017 – Fifty Shades Darker – Universal — Dana Brunetti, Michael De Luca, E.L. James, Marcus Viscidi
Baywatch – Paramount — Michael Berk, Beau Flynn, Ivan Reitman, Douglas Schwartz
Boo 2! A Madea Halloween – Lionsgate — Tyler Perry, Ozzie Areu, Will Areu, Mark E. Swinton
The Mummy – Universal — Sarah Bradshaw, Sean Daniel, Alex Kurtzman, Chris Morgan
Transformers: The Last Knight – Paramount — Ian Bryce, Tom DeSanto, Lorenzo di Bonaventura, K.C. Hodenfield, Don Murphy
2018 – Holmes & Watson – Columbia – Will Ferrell, Adam McKay, Jimmy Miller, Clayton Townsend
Death of a Nation (remake of Hillary's America: The Secret History of the Democratic Party) – Quality Flix – Gerald R. Molen
Death Wish – Metro-Goldwyn-Mayer – Roger Birnbaum
The Meg (rip-off of Jaws) – Warner Bros. – Lorenzo di Bonaventura, Colin Wilson, Belle Avery
Robin Hood – Summit Entertainment – Jennifer Davisson, Leonardo DiCaprio
2019 – Rambo: Last Blood – Lionsgate – Avi Lerner, Kevin King Templeton, Yariv Lerner, Les Weldon
Dark Phoenix – 20th Century Fox – Simon Kinberg, Hutch Parker, Lauren Shuler Donner, Todd Hallowell
Godzilla: King of the Monsters – Warner Bros. – Mary Parent, Alex Garcia, Thomas Tull, Jon Jashni, Brian Rogers
Hellboy – Lionsgate – Lawrence Gordon, Lloyd Levin, Mike Richardson, Philip Westgren, Carl Hampe, Matt O'Toole, Les Weldon, Yariv Lerner
A Madea Family Funeral – Lionsgate – Ozzie Areu, Will Areu, Mark E. Swinton
2020/21 - Dolittle - Universal - Joe Roth, Jeff Kirschenbaum, and Susan Downey
365 Days (rip-off of Fifty Shades of Grey) - Next Film - Maciej Kawulski, Ewa Lewandowska, and Tomasz Mandes
Fantasy Island - Columbia - Jason Blum, Marc Toberoff, and Jeff Wadlow
Hubie Halloween (rip-off of Ernest Scared Stupid) - Netflix - Adam Sandler, Kevin Grady, Dominico Hadelo and Allen Covert
Wonder Woman 1984 - Warner Bros. - Charles Roven, Deborah Snyder, Zack Snyder, Patty Jenkins, Gal Gadot and Stephen Jones
2021 - Space Jam: A New Legacy - Warner Bros.
Karen (inadvertent remake of Cruella) - Quiver Distribution 
Tom & Jerry - Warner Bros. 
Twist (rap remake of Oliver Twist) - Sky Cinema 
The Woman in the Window (rip-off of Rear Window) - Netflix
2022 - Pinocchio (Disney+)
Blonde (Netflix)
365 Days: This Day & The Next 365 Days 
Firestarter (Universal) 
Jurassic World Dominion (Universal)

References

Golden Raspberry Awards by category
Awards established in 1994
1994 establishments in the United States